Daýhan (prior to 1993 Gyzyl Daýhan) is a village in Burguçy geňeşligi, Döwletli District, Lebap Province, in eastern Turkmenistan, near the border with Afghanistan.

Etymology
The Turkmen word daýhan means "farmer, peasant" in Turkmen, and is borrowed from Persian دهقان (dehghan). The Turkic word kyzyl (gyzyl in Turkmen) means "red" and referred in the Soviet period to the color red, the color of revolution.

See also 
List of cities, towns and villages in Turkmenistan

References

External links
Satellite map at Maplandia.com

Populated places in Lebap Region